Angelo Damiano (born 30 September 1938) is a retired Italian track cyclist. Together with Sergio Bianchetto he won a gold medal in the tandem at the 1964 Summer Olympics in Tokyo. They had easy semifinals, because their German competitors were disqualified, and won a close final against the Soviet team.

After winning the national amateur sprint title in 1964, in 1965 Damiano turned professional and won a bronze medal in the sprint at the 1967 World Championships.

References

External links 

 
 

1938 births
Living people
Italian male cyclists
Olympic gold medalists for Italy
Cyclists at the 1964 Summer Olympics
Olympic cyclists of Italy
Italian track cyclists
Sportspeople from Naples
Olympic medalists in cycling
Medalists at the 1964 Summer Olympics
Cyclists from Campania
20th-century Italian people